Diploglottis campbellii is a rainforest tree  northern New South Wales and southeastern Queensland. Growing to 30 metres tall, it is commonly known as the small-leaved tamarind. It is rare and threatened and is restricted to a small number of sites, each with a maximum of 3 trees per site. However, it is readily available from nurseries in the Northern Rivers area of New South Wales, and in south-eastern Queensland.

It has soft hairy new growth that becomes hairless with age. It has a grey brown trunk, the outer surface of live bark is green with orange to brown blotches, leaves 10–35 cm long, leaflets 4–8 cm, glossy upper surface, pale dull bottom surface

The inflorescence type is a panicle up to 15 centimetres long with small creamy brown flowers, Fruit usually 2 lobed but can be 1 or 3 lobed (each lobe holding a single seed), hairless, Red (rarely yellow) with a brown capsule, ripe Feb- April.

Uses
The fruit of small-leaved tamarind is edible, and has a piquant flavour. It is used in sauces and preserves. Because the tree is very rare in the wild availability of fruit was a limitation for many years. However, increased planting of small-leaved tamarind has resulted in larger volumes of fruit becoming available for food, as well as ensuring the survival of this species.

The plant has proved adaptable in cultivation, being used in amenity horticulture and bushfood plantings. It is extensively planted in Lismore.

External sources
Information obtained at Tafe Grovely Campus

Sapindales of Australia
Trees of Australia
Ornamental trees
Crops originating from Australia
Endangered flora of Australia
Flora of Queensland
Endangered biota of Queensland
Flora of New South Wales
Bushfood
Australian cuisine
Australian Aboriginal bushcraft
campbellii